Maaradactylus is a genus of anhanguerid pterodactyloid pterosaur known from the Lower Cretaceous period (Aptian to Albian stages) of the Romualdo Formation of northeastern Brazil.

Discovery
 
Maaradactylus is based on the Museu Paleontologico de Santana do Cariri specimen MPSC R 2357, a skull, atlas, and axis discovered in 2010 in the Aptian—Albian-age Romualdo Formation of Sítio São Gonçalo, Santana do Cariri, Ceará, in the Araripe Basin of Brazil.

Maaradactylus was described by Renan Bantim and colleagues in 2014. The type species is Maaradactylus kellneri. The generic name refers to Maara, in the legends of the Cariri the daughter of a chief, by sorcery changed into a river monster with long teeth, devouring fishermen. The suffix ~dactylus is common in the names of pterosaurs and is derived from Greek δάκτυλος, daktylos, "finger", referring to the long (fourth) wing finger. The specific name honors Alexander Kellner, Brazil's foremost pterosaur expert.

In 2019, the species Coloborhynchus spielbergi, also assigned as Anhanguera spielbergi, was reassigned to Maaradactylus by Megan L. Jacobs and colleagues as M. spielbergi. This species was named after the filmmaker Steven Spielberg, the director of Jurassic Park by André J. Veldmeijer. The holotype of this species was prepared from a chunk of limestone of Albian-age originating from the Romualdo Member of the Santana Formation in Brazil and has been part of the collection of Naturalis Biodiversity Center in Leiden, The Netherlands since 1992. A replica is on display in one of the museum exhibitions.

Description
This anhanguerid also has a relatively tall crest running along the midline of the premaxillary bones, which make up most of the upper beak region, and placements for 35 pairs of teeth in the upper jaws.

The formerly known Coloborhynchus spielbergi (alternatively Anhanguera spielbergi), now Maaradactylus spielbergi, had rounded crests at the ends of expanded upper and lower jaws, similar to the related ornithocheirids. However, rather than the crests being robust and box-shaped as seen in many ornithocheirid genera, the jaw tips were more slender and spoon-shaped, and the crest is thin from top to bottom, both features commonly seen in anhanguerid species typically referred to the genus Anhanguera, a genus in which M. speilbergi was classified by some researchers as A. spielbergi. As in other ornithocheirids, the size and orientation of the teeth vary considerably along the jawline. In M. spielbergi, the tooth pattern has been described as more similar to Anhanguera rather than to Tropeognathus.

Classification

A topology recovered by Jacobs et al. in 2019 recovered Maaradactylus within the family Anhangueridae, and as the sister taxon of several Anhanguera species. Their cladogram is shown on the left. In 2020 however, a study by Borja Holgado and Rodrigo Pêgas had recovered Maaradactylus as the sister taxon of Cearadactylus, both belonging to the subfamily Anhanguerinae. Their cladogram is shown on the right.

Topology 1: Jacobs et al. (2019).

Topology 2: Holgado & Pêgas (2020).

See also
 List of pterosaur genera
 Timeline of pterosaur research

References

Pteranodontoids
Early Cretaceous pterosaurs of South America
Cretaceous Brazil
Fossils of Brazil
Romualdo Formation
Fossil taxa described in 2014